Robert Plisch (April 7, 1845 – March 13, 1915) was an American politician and farmer.

Born in Silesia, Germany, Plisch emigrated with his family to the United States in 1856. He was a farmer and lived in the community of Ziegler, in the town of Berlin, in Marathon County. He served on the Berlin Town Board, the Marathon County Board of Supervisors, and was deputy sheriff. He was also involved with the Marathon County Agricultural Society. He served in the Wisconsin State Assembly in 1895 and was a Democrat.

Notes

1845 births
1915 deaths
German emigrants to the United States
People from Marathon County, Wisconsin
Farmers from Wisconsin
County supervisors in Wisconsin
Wisconsin city council members
Democratic Party members of the Wisconsin State Assembly
19th-century American politicians